Sir Douglas Mawson OBE FRS FAA (5 May 1882 – 14 October 1958) was an Australian geologist, Antarctic explorer, and academic. Along with Roald Amundsen, Robert Falcon Scott, and Sir Ernest Shackleton, he was a key expedition leader during the Heroic Age of Antarctic Exploration.

Mawson was born in England and came to Australia as an infant. He completed degrees in mining engineering and geology at the University of Sydney. In 1905 he was made a lecturer in petrology and mineralogy at the University of Adelaide. Mawson's first experience in the Antarctic came as a member of Shackleton's Nimrod Expedition (1907–1909), alongside his mentor Edgeworth David. They were part of the expedition's northern party, which became the first to attain the South Magnetic Pole and to climb Mount Erebus.

After his participation in Shackleton's expedition, Mawson became the principal instigator of the Australasian Antarctic Expedition (1911–1914). The expedition explored thousands of kilometres of previously unexplored regions, collected geological and botanical samples, and made important scientific observations. Mawson was the sole survivor of the three-man Far Eastern Party, which travelled across the Mertz and Ninnis Glaciers named after his two deceased companions. Their deaths forced him to travel alone for over a month to return to the expedition's main base.

Mawson was knighted in 1914 and during World War I worked with the British and Russian militaries. He returned to the University of Adelaide in 1919 and became a full professor in 1921, contributing much to Australian geology. He returned to the Antarctic as the leader of the British Australian and New Zealand Antarctic Research Expedition (1929–1931), which led to a territorial claim in the form of the Australian Antarctic Territory. Mawson is commemorated by numerous landmarks and from 1984 to 1996 appeared on the Australian $100 note.

Early life 
Mawson was born on 5 May 1882 to Robert Ellis Mawson and Margaret Ann Moore.  He was born in Shipley, West Riding of Yorkshire, but was less than two years old when his family emigrated to Australia and settled at Rooty Hill, now in the western suburbs of Sydney; Later he and his family moved to the inner-Sydney suburb of Glebe in 1893. He attended Forest Lodge Public School, Fort Street Model School and the University of Sydney, where he graduated in 1902 with a Bachelor of Engineering degree.

Early work 
He was appointed geologist to an expedition to the New Hebrides (now Vanuatu) in 1903; his report, The Geology of the New Hebrides, was one of the first major geological works of Melanesia. Also that year he published a geological paper on Mittagong, New South Wales. His major influences in his geological career were Professor Edgeworth David and Professor Archibald Liversidge. He then became a lecturer in petrology and mineralogy at the University of Adelaide in 1905. He identified and first described the mineral davidite.

Nimrod Expedition 

Mawson joined Ernest Shackleton's Nimrod Expedition (1907–1909) to the Antarctic, originally intending to stay for the duration of the ship's presence in the first summer. Instead both he and his mentor, Edgeworth David, stayed an extra year. In doing so they became, in the company of Alistair Mackay, the first to climb the summit of Mount Erebus and to trek to the South Magnetic Pole, which at that time was over land.

Australasian Antarctic Expedition 

Mawson turned down an invitation to join Robert Falcon Scott's Terra Nova Expedition in 1910; Australian geologist Griffith Taylor went with Scott instead. Mawson chose to lead his own expedition, the Australasian Antarctic Expedition, to King George V Land and Adelie Land, the sector of the Antarctic continent immediately south of Australia, which at the time was almost entirely unexplored.

The objectives were to carry out geographical exploration and scientific studies, including a visit to the South Magnetic Pole.
Mawson raised the necessary funds in a year, from British and Australian governments, and from commercial backers interested in mining and whaling.

The expedition, using the ship SY Aurora commanded by Captain John King Davis, departed from Hobart on 2 December 1911, landed at Cape Denison (named after Hugh Denison, a major backer of the expedition) on Commonwealth Bay on 8 January 1912, and established the Main Base. A second camp was located to the west on the ice shelf in Queen Mary Land. They built a hut on the rocky cape and wintered through nearly constant blizzards. Mawson wanted to do aerial exploration and brought the first aeroplane to Antarctica. The aircraft, a Vickers R.E.P. Type Monoplane, was to be flown by Francis Howard Bickerton. When it was damaged in Australia shortly before the expedition departed, plans were changed so it was to be used only as a tractor on skis. However, the engine did not operate well in the cold, and it was removed and returned to Vickers in England. The aircraft fuselage itself was abandoned. On 1 January 2009, fragments of it were rediscovered by the Mawson's Huts Foundation, which is restoring the original huts.

Mawson's exploration program was carried out by five parties from the Main Base and two from the Western Base. Mawson himself was part of a three-man sledging team, the Far Eastern Party, with Xavier Mertz and Lieutenant Belgrave Ninnis, who headed east on 10 November 1912, to survey King George V Land. After five weeks of excellent progress mapping the coastline and collecting geological samples, the party was crossing the Ninnis Glacier 480 km east of the main base. Mertz was skiing and Mawson was on his sled with his weight dispersed, but Ninnis was jogging beside the second sled. Ninnis fell through a crevasse, and his body weight is likely to have breached the snow bridge covering it. The six best dogs, most of the party's rations, their tent, and other essential supplies disappeared into the massive crevasse.

After a brief service, Mawson and Mertz turned back immediately. They had one week's provisions for two men and no dog food but plenty of fuel and a primus. They sledged for 27 hours continuously to obtain a spare tent cover they had left behind, for which they improvised a frame from skis and a theodolite. Their lack of provisions forced them to use their remaining sled dogs to feed the other dogs and themselves:

There was a quick deterioration in the men's physical condition during this journey. Both men suffered dizziness; nausea; abdominal pain; irrationality; mucosal fissuring; skin, hair, and nail loss; and the yellowing of eyes and skin. Later Mawson noticed a dramatic change in his travelling companion. Mertz seemed to lose the will to move and wished only to remain in his sleeping bag. He began to deteriorate rapidly with diarrhoea and madness. On one occasion Mertz refused to believe he was suffering from frostbite and bit off the tip of his own little finger. This was soon followed by violent raging—Mawson had to sit on his companion's chest and hold down his arms to prevent him from damaging their tent. Mertz suffered further seizures before falling into a coma and dying on 8 January 1913.

It was unknown at the time that husky liver contains extremely high levels of vitamin A. It was also not known that such levels of vitamin A could cause liver damage to humans. With six dogs between them (with a liver on average weighing 1 kg), it is thought that the pair ingested enough liver to bring on a condition known as hypervitaminosis A. However, Mertz may have suffered more because he found the tough muscle tissue difficult to eat and therefore ate more of the liver than Mawson. While both men suffered, Mertz suffered more severely.

Mawson continued the final  alone. During his return trip to the Main Base he fell through the lid of a crevasse, and was saved only by his sledge wedging itself into the ice above him. He managed to climb out using the harness attaching him to the sled.

When Mawson finally made it back to Cape Denison, the ship Aurora had left only a few hours before. It was recalled by wireless communication, only to have bad weather thwart the rescue effort. Mawson and six men who had remained behind to look for him wintered a second year until December 1913. In Mawson's book Home of the Blizzard, he describes his experiences. His party, and those at the Western Base, had explored large areas of the Antarctic coast, describing its geology, biology and meteorology, and more closely defining the location of the South Magnetic Pole. In 1915, the Royal Geographical Society awarded him their Founder's Medal and in 1916 the American Geographical Society awarded him the David Livingstone Centenary Medal.

The expedition was the subject of David Roberts' book Alone on the Ice: The Greatest Survival Story in the History of Exploration.

Home of the Blizzard 

In his book The Home of the Blizzard, Mawson talked of "Herculean gusts" on 24 May 1912 which he learned afterwards "approached two hundred miles per hour".

Later life 
Mawson married Francisca Adriana (Paquita) Delprat (daughter of the metallurgist G. D. Delprat) on 31 March 1914 at Holy Trinity Church of England, Balaclava, Victoria. They had two daughters, Patricia and Jessica. Also in 1914, he was knighted, and was preoccupied with news of the Scott disaster until the outbreak of World War I. Mawson served in the war as a major in the British Ministry of Munitions. Returning to the University of Adelaide in 1919, he was promoted to the professorship of geology and mineralogy in 1921, and made a major contribution to Australian geology. He organised and led the joint British Australian and New Zealand Antarctic Research Expedition in 1929–31, which resulted in the formation of the Australian Antarctic Territory in 1936. He also spent much of his time researching the geology of the northern Flinders Ranges in South Australia.

Upon his retirement from teaching in 1952 he was made an emeritus professor of the University of Adelaide. He died at his Brighton home on 14 October 1958 from a cerebral haemorrhage. He was 76 years old. At the time of his death he had still not completed editorial work on all the papers resulting from his expedition, and this was completed by his eldest daughter, Patricia, only in 1975.

Legacy
In 1948, Carroll William Dodge published a genus of fungi within the family Lichinaceae, named Mawsonia in his honour.

His image appeared on several postage stamps of the Australian Antarctic Territory: 5 pence (1961), 5 pence (1961), 27 cents and 75 cents (1982),
10 cents (2011), 45 cents (1999).

His image appeared from 1984 to 1996 on the Australian paper one hundred dollar note and in 2012 on a $1 coin issued within the Inspirational Australians series. Mawson Peak (Heard Island), Mount Mawson (Tasmania), Mawson Station (Antarctica), Dorsa Mawson (Mare Fecunditatis), the geology building on the main University of Adelaide campus, suburbs in Canberra and Adelaide, a University of South Australian campus and the main street of Meadows, South Australia are named after him. At Oxley College in Burradoo, New South Wales, a sports house is called Mawson, as is at Clarence High School in Hobart, Tasmania, Forest Lodge Public School and Fort Street High School, both in Sydney, where he was educated. The Mawson Collection of Antarctic exploration artefacts is on permanent display at the South Australian Museum, including a screening of a recreated version of his journey that was shown on ABC Television on 12 May 2008.

Mawson (postcode 2607) is a suburb of Canberra, district of Woden Valley, Australian Capital Territory.  The suburb was gazetted in 1966 and is named after him. The theme for street names in this area is Antarctic exploration.

In 2011, Ranulph Fiennes included Mawson in his book My Heroes: Extraordinary Courage, Exceptional People.

In 2013 an "Australian Mawson Centenary Expedition" was led by Australian Polar scientists Chris Turney and Chris Fogwill, of the University of New South Wales, together with Antarctic veteran geologist and mountaineer Greg Mortimer and a group of scientists and adventurers. The expedition was centred on Antarctic and Sub-Antarctic oceanography, climate and biology. The ship, the MV Akademik Shokalskiy, became trapped in the Antarctic sea ice. In December 2013, some of the expedition members revisited Mawson's huts at Cape Denison on Commonwealth Bay.

After the release of Mawson's journals and other expedition records, some historians have questioned Mawson's navigation, risk-taking and leadership.

In December 2013, the first opera to be based on Mawson's 1911–1914 expedition to Antarctica, The Call of Aurora (by Tasmanian composer Joe Bugden) was performed at The Peacock Theatre in Hobart. The Call of Aurora investigates the relationship between Douglas Mawson and his wireless operator, Sidney Jeffryes, who developed symptoms of paranoia and had to be relieved of his duties.

In 2019, Australian Dance Theatre presented the premiere of South by Artistic Director Garry Stewart in Adelaide. The acclaimed contemporary dance work reflects upon the treacherous journey across the wilds of eastern Antarctica undertaken by Mawson and his ill-fated team in the summer of 1912–1913. Garry Stewart won Outstanding Achievement in Choreography for South in 2019 at the Australian Dance Awards, presented by AusDance. The work has since toured regional South Australia.

David Roberts' account of Mawson's AAE expedition, Alone on the Ice, and the deadly effect of dog liver are referenced in the plot of an episode of British television series New Tricks, where it is used to commit the almost-perfect murder.

The Mawson Trail in South Australia is also named after him.

Minor planet 4456 Mawson is named in his honour.

Burial 
Sir Douglas was buried at the historic cemetery of St Jude's Church, 444 Brighton Road, Brighton, South Australia, in 1958.

References

Sources 
 Bickel, Lennard [1977] (2001). This Accursed Land, foreword by Sir Edmund Hillary, Edinburgh: Birlinn Ltd. .
 Caesar, Adrian:The White: Last Days in the Antarctic Journeys of Scott and Mawson 1911–1913 Pan MacMillan, Sydney, 1999, 
 Hall, Lincoln (2000) Douglas Mawson, The Life of an Explorer New Holland, Sydney 
 Jacka, F. J. "Mawson, Sir Douglas (1882–1958)", Australian Dictionary of Biography, Volume 10, MUP, 1986, pp 454–457.
 Mawson, Sir Douglas, 2 vol. (1915) The Home of the Blizzard, being the story of the Australasian Antarctic expedition, 1911–1914 Vol. I, London: Ballantyne Press.
 
 Turney, Chris (2013), 1912: The Year The World Discovered Antarctica, Text Publishing, Melbourne.

Further reading 

 Roberts, David. Alone on the Ice: The Greatest Survival Story in the History of Exploration. (21 January 2013) W. W. Norton & Company. 
 Mawson's Antarctic Newspaper Mawson's Antarctic Newspaper, article in www.TheGlobalDispatches.com. Retrieved 9 January 2013
 Mawson, Douglas (Sir) (1882–1958) National Library of Australia, Trove, People and Organisation record for Sir Douglas Mawson
 Douglas Mawson in Antarctica
 Hurley, Frank. Collection of Photographic Prints. Images of Mawson Expedition 1911–14 held at Pictures Branch, National Library of Australia, Canberra
 National Archives of Australia, Records of BANZARE, Australian Antarctic Division, Department of External Affairs etc., personal papers of Baron Casey papers (M1129, A10299), Charles Francis Laseron, and P G Law (MP1002/1)
 "Sir Douglas Mawson, the unsung hero of Antarctica, gets his due at last", Paul Harris, The Observer, 26 January 2013
 E.M. Suzyumov (1960, 1968). A life given to the Antarctic. Douglas Mawson – Antarctic Explorer. Adelaide, Libraries Board of South Australia. Translated from the Russian. First published in "Remarcable Geographers and Travellers", State Publishing House of Geographical Literature, Moscow, 1960.

External links 

 
 
 
 
 

1882 births
1958 deaths
Australian Antarctic scientists
Australasian Antarctic Expedition
Australian explorers
20th-century Australian geologists
Australian Knights Bachelor
Australian Officers of the Order of the British Empire
English emigrants to Australia
Explorers of Antarctica
Fellows of the Australian Academy of Science
Fellows of the Royal Society
People educated at Fort Street High School
Scientists from Adelaide
People from Shipley, West Yorkshire
Sole survivors